The 2014 Individual Speedway Junior European Championship (also known as the 2014 Speedway European Under 21 Championship) was the 17th edition of the Championship.

The final was staged at Rybnik in Poland and was won by Václav Milík Jr., the second rider from the Czech Republic to do so. He won the final with a 15-point maximum.

Final - Rybnik 
 27 September 2014
  Rybnik

See also 
 2014 Speedway European Championship

References

2014
European Individual Junior